Intriguer is a 2010 album by Crowded House.

Intriguer may also refer to:

The Intriguers, a 1972 novel by Matt Helm novel

See also
Intrigue (disambiguation)